Samaneh is a Persian female given name (Persian: سمانه ). The meaning of this name is the sky.

Samaneh Maghrebiya, Persian spelling for the wife of Muhammad ibn 'Alī ibn Mūsā (circa April 12, 811 - c. November 29, 835) ninth of the Twelve Imams of Shia Islam, and mother of Imam Ali Hadi
Samaneh Beyrami Baher, cross-country skier
Samaneh Sheshpari, Iranian Taekwondo athlete Taekwondo at the 2010 Asian Games – Women's 53 kg
Samaneh Pakdel (fa), Iranian film actress, Merajiha 2014

References

Persian feminine given names